The Ministry of Defence of Bosnia and Herzegovina is the governmental department in charge of the Armed Forces of Bosnia and Herzegovina and protection of Bosnia and Herzegovina from invasion and threats.

History
Before the Ministry of Defence of Bosnia and Herzegovina, from 1945 to 1992, there was the Ministry of Defence of Yugoslavia, which operated for the entire then Socialist Federal Republic of Yugoslavia, while Bosnia and Herzegovina only had its territorial defence.

Following the independence of Bosnia and Herzegovina from Yugoslavia in 1992, the Ministry of Defence of the Republic of Bosnia and Herzegovina was formed, with Munib Bisić being appointed minister, who had the newly formed Army of the Republic of Bosnia and Herzegovina at his disposal. This ministry played a key role in defending Bosnia and Herzegovina from aggressors and paramilitary units inside and outside Bosnia and Herzegovina during the Bosnian War. In addition to the Ministry of Defence of the Republic of Bosnia and Herzegovina, there were two other Ministries of Defence in Bosnia and Herzegovina, the Ministry of Defence of the Republika Srpska and the Ministry of Defence of Herzeg-Bosnia.

After the signing of the Dayton Agreement and the end of the Bosnian War, two more armies remained, because after the signing of the agreement, the Army of the Federation of Bosnia and Herzegovina, thas is the Ministry of Defense of the Federation of Bosnia and Herzegovina was formed by merging the Croatian Defence Council, that is by merging the Ministry of Defense of the Republic of Bosnia and Herzegovina and the Ministry of Defense of Herzeg-Bosnia.

Ten years later, on 1 December 2005, the Armed Forces of Bosnia and Herzegovina, or the Ministry of Defence of Bosnia and Herzegovina, were formed by merging the Army of the Federation of Bosnia and Herzegovina and the Army of Republika Srpska, that is the Federal Ministry of Defence and the Ministry of Defence of Republika Srpska.

Since 25 January 2023, Zukan Helez (SDP BiH) has been serving as Minister Defence of Bosnia and Herzegovina.

Organization
The Ministry of Defence of Bosnia and Herzegovina consists of eight sectors and six offices, three of which are religious services.
Inspectorate General
Policy and Plans Sector
Sector for International Cooperation
Sector for Intelligence and Security Affairs
Sector for command, control and communications, computers and information management
Personnel Management Department
Procurement and Logistics Sector
Finance and Budget Sector
Internal Audit Office
Public Relations Office
Department for general and joint affairs
Office of the Military Mufti
Office of Orthodox Pastoral Care
Office of Catholic Pastoral Care

List of ministers

Ministers of Defence of the Republic of Bosnia and Herzegovina (1992–1996)
Political parties:

Ministers of Defence of Bosnia and Herzegovina (2004–present)

Political parties:

References

External links

Bosnia and Herzegovina
Defence
Defence
Military of Bosnia and Herzegovina
Bosnia and Herzegovina, Defence